The 2012 season of the Cook Islands Round Cup was the thirty ninth recorded season of top flight association football competition in the Cook Islands, with any results between 1951 and 1969 and also in 1986 and 1988–1990 currently unknown. Tupapa Maraerenga won the championship, and qualified for the 2013–14 OFC Champions League. This was their tenth recorded championship, although other sources suggest that their victories in 1992 and 1993 were won by Takuvaine and Avatiu respectively. It was also their second hat trick of titles following their successes in the 2001, 2002 and 2003 seasons. Nikao Sokattack were runners-up, with Arorangi finishing in third place.

League table
Tupapa Maraerenga won the league, which was played on a round robin home and away basis.

Results

References

Cook Islands Round Cup seasons
Cook
football